Spilarctia ananda is a moth in the family Erebidae. It was described by Walter Karl Johann Roepke in 1938. It is found on Java and possibly Malacca.

The larvae feed on Vernonia species.

References

Moths described in 1938
ananda